Medicosma heterophylla is a species of small tree in the family Rutaceae and is endemic to a restricted area of far north Queensland. It has simple and trifoliate, elliptical leaves and leaflets, and cream-coloured to pink or reddish flowers borne singly or in small groups in leaf axils.

Description

Taxonomy
Medicosma heterophylla was first formally described in 1985 by Thomas Gordon Hartley in the Australian Journal of Botany from specimens collected by Paul Irwin Forster in 1994 on the track to Pinnacle Rock near Karnak (near Mossman).

Distribution and habitat
It occurs along Roaring Meg Creek and near Karnak in far north Queensland.

Conservation status
This species is classified as of "least concern" under the Queensland Government Nature Conservation Act 1992.

References

heterophylla
Sapindales of Australia
Flora of Queensland
Plants described in 1985
Taxa named by Thomas Gordon Hartley